Mirabad is a town and union council of Tando Allahyar District in the Sindh Province of Pakistan. It has a population of 57,361, and is located in the north-east of the district where it forms part of Jhando Mari Taluka.

References

Union councils of Sindh
Populated places in Sindh